George Herbert Walker was an American banker.

George Herbert Walker may also refer to:

George Herbert Walker Jr., businessman and son of the banker.
George Herbert Walker III, United States Ambassador to Hungary from 2003 to 2006 and son of the businessman
George Herbert Walker IV, chairman and CEO of Neuberger Berman and son of the Ambassador